Oliver Orok (born ) is a Nigerian male former weightlifter, who competed in the 100 kg category and represented Nigeria at international competitions. He won the gold medal in the snatch at the 1984 World Weightlifting Championships lifting 172.5 kg. He participated at the 1984 Summer Olympics in the 100 kg event.

References

External links
 

1963 births
Living people
Nigerian male weightlifters
World Weightlifting Championships medalists
Place of birth missing (living people)
Olympic weightlifters of Nigeria
Weightlifters at the 1984 Summer Olympics
Weightlifters at the 1982 Commonwealth Games
Commonwealth Games medallists in weightlifting
Commonwealth Games gold medallists for Nigeria
Medallists at the 1982 Commonwealth Games